McIlhargey is a surname. Notable people with the surname include:

Jack McIlhargey (1952–2020), Canadian ice hockey player
Steve McIlhargey (born 1962), Scottish footballer